Bermuda competed at the 1948 Summer Olympics in London, England.

Athletics

Men
Track & road events

Women
Track & road events

Field events

Diving

Men

Swimming

Men

References
Official Olympic Reports

Nations at the 1948 Summer Olympics
1948 Summer Olympics
1948 in Bermudian sport